Tia Fuller (born March 27, 1976) is an American saxophonist, composer, and educator, and a member of the all-female band touring with Beyoncé.  Fuller is currently a faculty member in the ensembles department at Berklee College of Music. Fuller was a Featured Jazz Musician in Pixar's full length computer-animated feature Soul. For the film Fuller plays an alto saxophone with a Vandoren mouthpiece for the character Dorothea Williams.  The appearance of Dorothea Williams is influenced by Fuller, and the character's speaking lines are voiced by Angela Bassett.

Background

Fuller was born in Aurora, Colorado to jazz musicians Fred and Elthopia Fuller. Her father, Fred, plays bass and her mother, Elthopia, sings. Her sister, Shamie, is also a jazz musician and educator. She grew up listening to her parents rehearse in the basement of their home, as well as to the music of John Coltrane, Sarah Vaughan and Charlie Parker.

Fuller began playing saxophone at Gateway High School, after which she continued her musical education at Spelman College in Atlanta, Georgia, under the tutelage of Joseph Jennings.  While there she performed with Ray Charles and in Atlanta's jazz clubs.  In 1998, she graduated magna cum laude with a Bachelor of Arts degree in music, and later went on to complete her master's degree in jazz pedagogy and performance from the University of Colorado at Boulder.

Career
Fuller has regularly performed with a number of jazz artists, including Esperanza Spalding, Terri Lyne Carrington, Ralph Peterson Septet, the T.S. Monk Septet, the Jon Faddis Jazz Orchestra, the Rufus Reid Septet, the Sean Jones Quintet and the Nancy Wilson Jazz Orchestra.

Fuller has led a quartet which includes Shamie Royston on piano, Kim Thompson on drums, and Miriam Sullivan on bass, and with whom she has recorded the albums Pillar of Strength (2005, Wambui), Healing Space (2007, Mack Avenue), and Decisive Steps (2010, Mack Avenue).

In 2006, she was a member of the all-female band touring with Beyoncé.

In 2012, she toured with Esperanza Spalding as leader of the Radio Music Society horn section, in which she played saxophone in dialogue with Spalding's scat singing.

In 2019, she recorded with Roy Haynes, Jon Batiste, Linda May Han Oh and Marcus Gilmore for The Walt Disney Company's movie Soul.

Fuller was nominated for a Grammy Award for her 2019 album Diamond Cut

She was artist in residence at the  Burlington Discover Jazz Festival.

She teaches at Berklee College of Music.

Education
In 1998, Fuller graduated magna cum laude with a bachelor's degree in music from Spelman College, and went on to obtain a master's degree in jazz pedagogy and performance from the University of Colorado at Boulder.

Discography

As leader
 Pillar of Strength  (Wambui, 2005)
 Healing Space (Mack Avenue, 2007)
 Decisive Steps (Mack Avenue, 2010)
 Angelic Warrior (Mack Avenue, 2012)
  Diamond Cut (Mack Avenue, 2018)

 Compilations 
 It's Christmas on Mack Avenue (Mack Avenue, 2014)

As sideman
with Joe Budden
 Joe Budden (Def Jam, 2003)

with Miki Hayama
 Vibrant (Art Union @ Jazz, 2004)

 with Sean Jones
 Eternal Journey (Mack Avenue, 2004)
 Gemini (Mack Avenue, 2005)
 Roots  (Mack Avenue, 2006)
 Kaleidoscope (Mack Avenue, 2007)

with Brad Leali
 Maria Juanez (TCB Music, 2007)

with Nancy Wilson
 Turned to Blue'' (MCG Jazz, 2006)

References

External links
 
 Mack Avenue Artist Page

American bandleaders
American session musicians
Living people
1976 births
Spelman College alumni
People from Aurora, Colorado
Musicians from Jersey City, New Jersey
American women jazz musicians
African-American jazz musicians
Jazz musicians from Colorado
21st-century American saxophonists
Women jazz saxophonists
21st-century American women musicians
Mack Avenue Records artists
Berklee College of Music faculty
African-American women musicians